The Weak's End is the debut studio album by American post-hardcore band Emery. The original release was released on January 15, 2004, with the re-issued version released on January 27, 2004. Most of the albums available are labeled the re-released version (which includes the cover of the broken fishbowl as shown), in which the title of track 6 is changed. Although the two albums look different, the actual songs themselves are very similar.

Track listing

Personnel
 Band
Toby Morrell — lead & unclean vocals, acoustic guitar
Devin Shelton — co-lead vocals, rhythm guitar
Josh Head — unclean vocals, keyboards
Matt Carter — lead guitar
Joel "Chopper" Green — bass
Seth "Beef" Studley — drums

 Production
Jon Dunn — A&R
Emery — mixing (tracks 4, 6, 10)
Troy Glessner — mastering, additional tracking
Zach Hodges — mixing (track 6)
Kris McCaddon — photography
J.R. McNeely — mixing (tracks 1-3, 5, 7-9)
Ed Rose — engineer, producer

The Weak's End - Live Version (2021)
On September 27, 2021, the live album titled The Weak's End (Live Version) was released for streaming services via BC Music.

References

Emery (band) albums
2004 debut albums
Albums produced by Ed Rose
Tooth & Nail Records albums